Kapyl is a town in Minsk Region, Belarus. It is the administrative center of Kapyl District. The current population estimate of 9,900 for the town is based on the provisional figures from the 2009 census.

The postal codes for Kapyl are 223910 and 223927.

History

Kapyl, first mentioned in 1274, was a walled town that was noteworthy by the 14th century, and is listed in the atlas of Ortelius of 1574. During the 14th century the town was part of the Grand Duchy of Lithuania. In 1395 it came into the possession of Prince Vladimir Olgerdovich and his heirs, the Olelkovich family, where it remained until 1612.  Kapyl was part of the dowry of Zofia Olelkowicz Słucka and was one of the seven fortified towns left to her husband Janusz Radziwill upon her death in 1612.
Kapyl was attacked by the Tatars numerous times and was sacked on at least one occasion during the 16th century.

On August 27, 1652, Kapyl received the Magdeburg Law and gained its own seal, a coat of arms depicting a hunting horn on a gold field.  With this privilege came the right to hold fairs and weekly auctions.  During the 16th century weaving became established in the town, including the production of velvet.  Six guilds came into existence as a result of the growth of the weaving industry.

After the Second Partition of Poland in 1793 Kapyl became part of the Russian Empire.  From 1832 it became a personal holding of Prince Wittgenstein.  During the 19th century local businesses included a brewery, 2 water mills, and 6 shops.   Other local institutions included 3 schools, churches (including a Calvinist church), and 2 Jewish synagogues.

Towards the end of the 19th century Kapyl had over 350 houses and over 2000 inhabitants.  At that time a majority of the town's population was Jewish.  By 1900 the Jewish population was 2,671.

In 1924, Kapyl became the capital city of the Kapyl District.

During World War II the Slutsk-Kapyl area was the subject of a German military operation code-named Erntefest II (Harvest Festival) which ended in February 1943.  Although ostensibly aimed at suppressing the activities of Soviet partisans in the area the operation resulted in the deaths of 2,325 of the local inhabitants (against the loss of six German soldiers), which can only be characterized as a campaign of genocide and terror.

One of Kapyl district's major architectural monuments is a 19th-century church in the town itself.

Personalities
Mendele Mocher Sforim, author
Renald Knysh, gymnastics coach

Sister cities
 Joniškis, Lithuania

See also
List of towns with German town law

References

Further reading 
 Geographical Dictionary of Polish Kingdom and other Slavic countries (in Polish), vol 4, edited by F. Sulimirskiego, B. Chlebowski, W. Walewski, Warsaw 1883, pp 386-387.

External links
 
 
 Kapyl District at Treklens
 Kopyl raion page at Minsk Oblispolkom website
 Rodoh Forum: Major Antipartisan Operations in Belorussia
 Kopyl Region Executive Committee
 Belarus City Population

Populated places in Minsk Region
Kapyl District
Towns in Belarus
Nowogródek Voivodeship (1507–1795)
Slutsky Uyezd
Holocaust locations in Belarus